Awadh Khrees (born 5 January 1991) is a Saudi Arabian professional footballer who plays as a right back for Al-Jabalain.

Honours
Al-Ittihad
Crown Prince Cup: 2016–17
King Cup: 2018

Al-Faisaly
King Cup: 2020–21

References

External links
 

Living people
1991 births
People from Najran
Saudi Arabian footballers
Association football fullbacks
Najran SC players
Ittihad FC players
Al-Faisaly FC players
Al-Adalah FC players
Al-Riyadh SC players
Al-Jabalain FC players
Saudi Professional League players
Saudi First Division League players